Lomatium is a genus in the family Apiaceae. It consists of about 100 species native to western Northern America and northern Mexico. Its common names include biscuitroot, Indian parsley, and desert parsley. It is in the family Apiaceae and therefore related to many familiar edible species such as carrots and celery; some Lomatium species are extensively used by Native Americans in the inland Northwest as a staple food.

Description
Roots range from woody taproots to more fleshy underground tuberous-thickened roots. Most lomatiums are desert species or grow on bluffs or mountain slopes where water is limited for most of the year. They are green and grow the most during the spring when water is available, and many species then set seed and dry out completely above ground before the hottest part of the year, while storing the energy they gained from photosynthesizing while water was available to them in their deep roots. For most of the year, the plant is not visible; the brown tops often are blown off or easily crushed, but it lies dormant underground for the next spring.

The flowers are arranged in compound umbels, without involucral bracts (or with inconspicuous bracts). The flowers are white or yellow, more rarely a purple or maroon color. As with most Apiaceae, the fruit sets the genus apart from other yellow- or white-flowered look-alikes such as Cymopterus and Orogenia. Uniquely, they are dorsally flattened and winged, which can be papery or corky, but help the seed to disperse further on the wind. The dorsal ribs may or may not be on the fruit, but are narrowly winged if at all. Leaves are mainly basal and dissected (ternately, pinnately, or ternate-pinnately dissected or compound), many look like ferns or can be mistaken for them.

Taxonomy
The genus Lomatium was established by Constantine Samuel Rafinesque in 1819. Kurt Sprengel published the name Cogswellia in 1920; this is regarded as an illegitimate name as it was superfluous.

Selected species 
, Plants of the World Online accepted the following species:

Lomatium ambiguum (Nutt.) J.M.Coult. & Rose
Lomatium andrusianum M.Stevens & Mansfield
Lomatium anomalum M.E.Jones ex J.M.Coult. & Rose
Lomatium attenuatum Evert
Lomatium austiniae (J.M.Coult. & Rose) J.M.Coult. & Rose
Lomatium bentonitum K.M.Carlson & Mansfield
Lomatium bicolor (S.Watson) J.M.Coult. & Rose
Lomatium bradshawii (Rose) Mathias & Constance
Lomatium brandegeei (J.M.Coult. & Rose) J.F.Macbr.
Lomatium brunsfeldianum Kemper & R.P.McNeill
Lomatium californicum (Nutt.) Mathias & Constance
Lomatium canbyi (J.M.Coult. & Rose) J.M.Coult. & Rose
Lomatium caruifolium (Hook. & Arn.) J.M.Coult. & Rose
Lomatium ciliolatum Jeps.
Lomatium columbianum Mathias & Constance
Lomatium congdonii J.M.Coult. & Rose
Lomatium cookii Kagan
Lomatium cous (S.Watson) J.M.Coult. & Rose
Lomatium cusickii (S.Watson) J.M.Coult. & Rose
Lomatium cuspidatum Mathias & Constance
Lomatium dasycarpum (Torr. & A.Gray) J.M.Coult. & Rose
Lomatium depauperatum (M.E.Jones) J.A.Alexander & Whaley
Lomatium dissectum (Nutt.) Mathias & Constance
Lomatium donnellii (J.M.Coult. & Rose) J.M.Coult. & Rose
Lomatium eastwoodiae (J.M.Coult. & Rose) J.F.Macbr.
Lomatium engelmannii Mathias
Lomatium erythrocarpum Meinke & Constance
Lomatium farinosum (Geyer) J.M.Coult. & Rose
Lomatium filicinum (M.E.Jones) Mansfield & M.Stevens
Lomatium foeniculaceum (Nutt.) J.M.Coult. & Rose
Lomatium fusiformis (S.Watson) J.F.Sm. & Mansfield
Lomatium geyeri (S.Watson) J.M.Coult. & Rose
Lomatium gormanii (Howell) J.M.Coult. & Rose
Lomatium graveolens (S.Watson) Dorn & R.L.Hartm.
Lomatium grayi (J.M.Coult. & Rose) J.M.Coult. & Rose
Lomatium greenmanii Mathias
Lomatium hallii (S.Watson) J.M.Coult. & Rose
Lomatium hendersonii (J.M.Coult. & Rose) J.M.Coult. & Rose
Lomatium hooveri (Mathias & Constance) Constance & B.Ertter
Lomatium howellii (S.Watson) Jeps.
Lomatium idahoense Mathias & Constance
Lomatium insulare (Eastw.) Munz
Lomatium junceum Barneby & N.H.Holmgren
Lomatium juniperinum (M.E.Jones) J.M.Coult. & Rose
Lomatium klickitatense J.A.Alexander & Whaley
Lomatium knokei Darrach
Lomatium kogholiini K.M.Mason & Willie
Lomatium laevigatum J.M.Coult. & Rose
Lomatium latilobum (Rydb.) Mathias
Lomatium linearifolium (S.Watson) J.F.Sm. & Mansfield
Lomatium lithosolamans J.F.Sm. & M.A.Feist
Lomatium lucidum (Nutt.) Jeps.
Lomatium macrocarpum (Hook. & Arn.) J.M.Coult. & Rose
Lomatium marginatum (Benth.) J.M.Coult. & Rose
Lomatium martindalei (J.M.Coult. & Rose) J.M.Coult. & Rose
Lomatium minimum (Mathias) Mathias
Lomatium minus (Rose ex Howell) Mathias & Constance
Lomatium mohavense (J.M.Coult. & Rose) J.M.Coult. & Rose
Lomatium multifidum (Nutt.) R.P.McNeill & Darrach
Lomatium nevadense (S.Watson) J.M.Coult. & Rose
Lomatium nudicaule (Nutt.) J.M.Coult. & Rose
Lomatium nuttallii (A.Gray) J.F.Macbr.
Lomatium observatorium Constance & B.Ertter
Lomatium ochocense Helliwell & Constance
Lomatium oreganum (J.M.Coult. & Rose) J.M.Coult. & Rose
Lomatium orientale J.M.Coult. & Rose
Lomatium papilioniferum J.A.Alexander & Whaley
Lomatium parryi (S.Watson) J.F.Macbr.
Lomatium parvifolium (Hook. & Arn.) Jeps.
Lomatium pastorale Darrach & D.H.Wagner
Lomatium peckianum Mathias & Constance
Lomatium piperi J.M.Coult. & Rose
Lomatium planosum (Osterh.) Mansfield & S.R.Downie
Lomatium quintuplex Schlessman & Constance
Lomatium ravenii Mathias & Constance
Lomatium repostum (Jeps.) Mathias
Lomatium rigidum (M.E.Jones) Jeps.
Lomatium rollinsii Mathias & Constance
Lomatium roneorum Darrach
Lomatium roseanum Cronquist
Lomatium salmoniflorum (J.M.Coult. & Rose) Mathias & Constance
Lomatium sandbergii (J.M.Coult. & Rose) J.M.Coult. & Rose
Lomatium scabrum (J.M.Coult. & Rose) Mathias
Lomatium serpentinum (M.E.Jones) Mathias
Lomatium shevockii R.L.Hartm. & Constance
Lomatium simplex (Nutt. ex S.Watson) J.F.Macbr.
Lomatium stebbinsii Schlessman & Constance
Lomatium suksdorfii (S.Watson) J.M.Coult. & Rose
Lomatium swingerae R.P.McNeill
Lomatium tamanitchii Darrach & Thie
Lomatium tarantuloides Darrach & Hinchliff
Lomatium tenuissimum (Geyer ex Hook.) M.A.Feist & G.M.Plunkett
Lomatium thompsonii (Mathias) Cronquist
Lomatium torreyi (J.M.Coult. & Rose) J.M.Coult. & Rose
Lomatium tracyi Mathias & Constance
Lomatium triternatum (Pursh) J.M.Coult. & Rose
Lomatium tuberosum Hoover
Lomatium utriculatum (Nutt.) J.M.Coult. & Rose
Lomatium vaginatum J.M.Coult. & Rose
Lomatium watsonii (J.M.Coult. & Rose) J.M.Coult. & Rose

Ecology
It grows in a variety of habitats throughout western North America, from coastal bluffs to piles of basalt rock.

Conservation concerns
Many species' habitats are under threat by grazing, development, and wildfires. Also, some concern exists about particular species such as L. dissectum, which is mainly harvested from the wild for herbal uses.

Because the genus is so difficult to identify, but has great genetic diversity, new species are still being found today such as L. tarantuloides,. Many species often have a very limited geographical range, with the plants being few in number.

Cultivation and uses
Several species, including L. cous, L. geyeri, and L. macrocarpum, are sometimes known as biscuit roots for their starchy edible roots.  These are or have been traditional Native American foods, eaten cooked or dried and ground into flour. Some Native Americans ground Lomatium into mush and shaped it into cakes and stored them for later use. Their flavor has been compared to celery, parsnip, or stale biscuits.

References

External links
 
 
 USDA Plants Profile
 UVSC Herbarium - Lomatium
 Food uses at Plants for a Future

 
Apioideae genera
Flora of North America
Edible Apiaceae
Root vegetables
Medicinal plants of North America
Taxa named by Constantine Samuel Rafinesque